Cefalo e Procri (Cephalus and Procris) is a chamber opera in three scenes and a prologue by Ernst Krenek, his Op. 77, begun in 1933 and finished on 3 August 1934. The Italian libretto by Rinaldo Küfferle (1903–1955, now remembered for many singing translations from Russian and German into Italian) was commissioned by Universal Edition for the third Venice Festival. The half-hour work was revived at the Gran Teatro La Fenice in Venice in October 2017 as part of a short double-bill with a setting of the 'Lamento di Procri' by Silvia Colasanti, conducted by Tito Ceccherini.

Background 
The festival came at a time of great tension between Italy and Germany over assassination attempts on the Italian-backed dictator Engelbert Dollfuß, and Benito Mussolini, who had taken a great interest in the festival, was intent on courting an Austrian composer. Alfredo Casella (perhaps unaware of Der Diktator) was responsible for steering the commission to Krenek.   

The half-hour work premiered 15 September 1934 after the original conductor, bewildered by the twelve-tone score, was replaced by Hermann Scherchen. An anticipated companion piece by Honegger never materialized, and the program was shared with Vittorio Rieti's Teresa nel bosco and Antonio Veretti's Una favola di Andersen.   Krenek had written to Küfferle to suggest something from Ovid's Metamorphoses, though he seems to have been taken back by Küfferle's choice of subject; perhaps the character of Procris (who was courted in disguise by her husband) was inspired by a production of Così fan tutte at the festival, which also saw the Italian premiere of Die Frau ohne Schatten. Krenek called his work a fable, using not the phrase "favola in musica" but  "Moralità pseudo-classica" in homage to the later Italian baroque opera, and set it as a series of arias and recitatives.  Audience reaction was lukewarm and  the reviews mixed; the loudest ovations were for Küfferle, wearing a fascist uniform.

Roles

Critical assessment 
Stewart gives an unfavorable assessment ("Küfferle should have found some way to leave the dog out"), but does note that Alban Berg liked the score. Krenek himself scarcely ever mentioned his "brief and issueless flight into Italian opera" again.

References 
Notes

Further reading
Juverra, Filippo, Antikendeutung einmal anders: Cefalo e Procri in "Der zauberhafte, aber schwierige Beruf des Opernschreibens": Das Musiktheater Ernst Kreneks ed. C. M. Zenck (Argus 2006) 
Stewart, John Lincoln, Ernst Krenek: the Man and His Music, Ewing, New Jersey: University of California Press, 1991 

Operas by Ernst Krenek
Operas
Chamber operas
One-act operas
Italian-language operas
Operas based on Metamorphoses
1934 operas